The 1881 Wisconsin gubernatorial election was held on November 8, 1881.

Republican nominee Jeremiah McLain Rusk defeated Democratic nominee Nicholas D. Fratt and two other nominees with 47.57% of the vote.

This was the last Wisconsin gubernatorial election held in an odd-numbered year. In 1882, a constitutional amendment was carried moving gubernatorial elections to even-numbered years.

General election

Candidates
Major party candidates
Nicholas D. Fratt, Democratic, President of the Racine County Bank, Democratic nominee for Wisconsin's 1st congressional district in 1874
Jeremiah McLain Rusk, Republican, former member of the United States House of Representatives

Other candidates
Theodore D. Kanouse, Prohibition
Edward P. Allis, Greenback, Greenback nominee for Governor of Wisconsin in 1877

Results

References

Bibliography
 
 
 

1881
Wisconsin
Gubernatorial